Bartolomeo Olivieri or Bartholomaeus Olivieri (1642–1708) was a Roman Catholic prelate who served as Bishop of Umbriatico (1696–1708).

Biography
Bartolomeo Olivieri was born in Cutro, Italy on 3 December 1642 and ordained a priest on 30 January 1667.
On 17 December 1696, he was appointed during the papacy of Pope Innocent XII as Bishop of Umbriatico. On 21 December 1696, he was consecrated bishop by Sebastiano Antonio Tanara, Cardinal-Priest of Santi Quattro Coronati, with Prospero Bottini, Titular Archbishop of Myra, and Giorgio Spínola, Bishop of Albenga, serving as co-consecrators. He served as Bishop of Umbriatico until his death on 24 August 1708.

References

External links and additional sources
 (for Chronology of Bishops) 
 (for Chronology of Bishops) 

People from the Province of Crotone
17th-century Italian Roman Catholic bishops
18th-century Italian Roman Catholic bishops
Bishops appointed by Pope Innocent XII
1642 births
1708 deaths